Céline Lecompére (born 8 June 1983) is a French short track speed skater. She competed in the women's 3000 metre relay event at the 2006 Winter Olympics.

References

1983 births
Living people
French female short track speed skaters
Olympic short track speed skaters of France
Short track speed skaters at the 2006 Winter Olympics
People from Troyes
21st-century French women